This is a list of Japanese infantry weapons in Second Sino-Japanese War.

Infantry Regular Artillery 

 7cm Field Gun (75 mm)
 7 cm Mountain Gun (75mm)
 Type 31 75 mm Field Gun
 Type 31 75 mm Mountain Gun
 Type 41 75 mm Mountain Gun "Rentai Ho"(regimental artillery)
 Type 41 75 mm Cavalry Gun
 Type 90 75 mm Field Gun
 Type 94 75 mm Mountain Gun
 Type 95 75 mm Field Gun

Infantry Anti Tank Gun 

 Type 94 37 mm Anti-Tank Gun
 Type 1 37 mm Anti-Tank Gun
 Type 1 47 mm Anti-Tank Gun
 Type Ra 37 mm Anti-Tank Gun (local derivation of German PAK 35/36 captured to Chinese) for use in guadalcanal and Chinese front.

Infantry Support Gun 

 Type 11 37 mm Infantry Gun
 Type 92 70 mm Infantry Gun "Daitai Ho"(Battalion Artillery)

Infantry Howitzer 

 Krupp 12 mm david
 Krupp 15 cm Howitzer
 Type 38 12 cm Howitzer
 Type 38 15 cm Howitzer
 Type 4 15 cm Howitzer
 Type 91 10 cm Howitzer
 Type 96 15 cm Howitzer
 28 cm Howitzer
 Type 45 24 cm Howitzer
 Type 7 30 cm david

Infantry Heavy Artillery Cannons 

 Krupp 10.5 cm Cannon
 Type 38 10 cm Cannon
 Type 14 10 cm Cannon
 Type 92 10 cm Cannon
 Type 45 15 cm Cannon
 Type 7 10 cm Cannon
 Type 7 15 cm Cannon
 Type 11 75 mm Cannon
 Type 89 15 cm Cannon
 Type 96 24 cm Howitzer
 Type 96 15 cm Cannon

Tank Cannons (in regular tank use) 

 57 mm Tank Cannon
 37 mm Tank Cannon
 47 mm Tank Cannon

Infantry Mortars 

 Type 11 70 mm Infantry Mortar
 Type 94 90 mm Infantry Mortar
 Type 96 150 mm Infantry Mortar
 Type 97 81 mm Infantry Mortar
 Type 97 90 mm Infantry Mortar
 Type 97 150 mm Infantry Mortar
 Type 99 81 mm Infantry Mortar
 Type 2 120 mm Infantry Mortar
 Type 98 50 mm Mortar
 15 cm Heavy Mortar
 Type 14 27 cm Heavy Mortar
 Type 98 32 cm Spigot Mortar

Infantry Anti-Aircraft Gun 

 Type 98 20 mm AA Machine Cannon
 Type 2 20 mm AA Machine Cannon
 20 mm Twin AA Machine Cannon
 Model 96 25 mm Dual Purpose Anti-Tank/Anti-Aircraft Gun
 Vickers Type 40 mm Dual Purpose Anti-Tank/Anti-Aircraft Gun
 AA Mine Discharger (7 or 8 cm)
 Type 11 75 mm AA Gun
 Type 88 75 mm AA Gun
 Type 4 75 mm AA Gun
 Type 99 88 mm AA Gun (based on Krupp 88 mm Flak of the German Navy (8.8 cm/45 SK C/30), which was captured in China)
 Type 14 10 cm AA Gun

Infantry Rifles 

 Type 38 Rifle
 Type 38 Cavalry Rifle
 Type 44 Cavalry Rifle
 Type 97 Sniper Rifle
 Type 99 Rifle
 Type 99 sniper rifle
 TERA Rifles (Type 100 Rifle, Type 1 Rifle, Type 2 Rifle)

Infantry Pistols 

 Type 26 9 mm Pistol
 Type 14 8 mm Nambu Pistol
 Type 94 8 mm Pistol

Infantry Submachine Gun 

 Bergmann Submachine Gun
 Type 100 submachine gun

Infantry Machine Guns 

 Type 11 Light Machine Gun
 Type 96 Light Machine Gun
 Type 99 Light Machine Gun
 Type 3 Heavy Machine Gun
 Type 92 Heavy Machine Gun
 Type 1 Heavy Machine Gun
 7.7 mm Tank Machine Gun

Infantry Hand Grenade 

 Type 10 Grenade
 Type 91 Grenade
 Type 97 Grenade
 Type 99 Grenade
 Type 10 Grenade Discharger
 Type 89 Grenade Discharger

Infantry Anti-Tank Weapons 

 Type 97 20 mm AT Rifle
 Type 93 mine
 Type 99 AT Mine
 Type 2 AT Rifle Grenade
 Rifle Grenade Dischargers
 Type 3 AT Grenade

Other Infantry Equipment 

 Type 100 Flamethrower
 Type 98 Military Sword
 Infantry Armor

References 

Infantry weapons
Second Sino-Japanese War
Second Sino-Japanese War, infantry
Second Sino-Japanese War, infantry
Second-Sino Japanese War